Retribution is the fourth studio album by Canadian Inuk musician Tanya Tagaq, which was released on October 21, 2016 on Six Shooter Records.

"Rape Me" is a cover of a song by American grunge band Nirvana. The album also features a collaboration with rapper Shad on the track "Centre", and Inuk artist Laakuluk Williamson Bathory on the track "Retribution".

The album was a longlisted nominee for the 2017 Polaris Music Prize.

Track listing

References

2016 albums
Tanya Tagaq albums
Six Shooter Records albums